Endika Bordas Losada (born 8 March 1982 in Bermeo, Biscay) is a Spanish former professional footballer who played as a midfielder, currently a manager.

Managerial statistics

References

External links

1982 births
Living people
People from Bermeo
Sportspeople from Biscay
Spanish footballers
Footballers from the Basque Country (autonomous community)
Association football midfielders
La Liga players
Segunda División players
Segunda División B players
Tercera División players
Bermeo FT footballers
CD Basconia footballers
Bilbao Athletic footballers
Athletic Bilbao footballers
Terrassa FC footballers
CE L'Hospitalet players
Córdoba CF players
UD Salamanca players
SD Amorebieta footballers
Gernika Club footballers
FC Lokomotivi Tbilisi players
Spain youth international footballers
Spanish expatriate footballers
Expatriate footballers in Georgia (country)
Spanish expatriate sportspeople in Georgia (country)
Spanish football managers
Segunda División B managers
Arenas Club de Getxo managers